Imam Maturidi International Scientific Research Center, is an Islamic research center dedicated to the renewal of Maturidi thought in 'aqidah. It was established by the initiative of the president of Uzbekistan Shavkat Mirziyoyev in August 11, 2020.

Departments 
 Department of Research on Maturidiyya Studies.
 Department of Modern Islamic Studies.
 Department of Translations.
 Department of Publications.
 Department of International Relations.
 Information Resource Center.

Focus 
The main focus is the in-depth study of the scientific heritage of Imam Abu Mansur al-Maturidi, and the contribution of Maturidi scholars, such as Abu al-Mu'in al-Nasafi to the study of Kalam. Other efforts include general education about Islam, as well as combating ignorance, religious fanaticism, and extremism.

Symposiums and conferences 
The first online scientific symposium of the Imam Maturidi International Scientific Research Center under the International Islamic Academy of Uzbekistan was held on March 17, 2021. The second symposium was organized by the two institutions, in cooperation with IRCICA, on 26 May 2022.

See also 
 2020 International Maturidi Conference
 Tashkent State University of Oriental Studies
 Imam Maturidi Application and Research Center at Selçuk University
 Research Centre for Islamic History, Art and Culture
 International Islamic University Malaysia
 Darul Uloom Deoband

References

Sources

Arabic

Russian

Turkish

Uzbek

External links 
 Official website
 
 
 

2020 establishments in Uzbekistan
Research institutes in Uzbekistan
Maturidi
Shavkat Mirziyoev